Richard C. Rudolph (1909-April 9, 2003) was an American professor of Chinese Literature and Archaeology at the University of California, Los Angeles.

Career
His professional career all but began with his first trip to in 1948–49, just before it closed with the Communist Revolution, and more or less ended with his second trip in 1973 as a member of the first group of American scholars to enter before the normalization of relations. This closing during virtually his entire professional life was a deep disappointment to him, almost a personal tragedy, and one he compensated for to some degree with a love that lasted his whole life.  He was a bibliophile and a linguist at heart, being fluent in Classical Chinese, Mandarin, Manchu, Mongolian, Classical Japanese, modern Japanese, German, French, Italian, and Spanish—and having begun but never mastered Tibetan and Russian.

Rudolph received his Ph.D. in Chinese literature in 1942, studying with the famous sinologists Ferdinand Lessing and Peter Boodberg.  He saw very little of his father throughout his life (though his free-spending and at times wealthy father did pay enough attention to disinherit him for going into Chinese studies), and Lessing was himself estranged from his own son when the son joined the Nazi party (the son was later executed by the Nazis in the last days of the war).  Something of a father-son relationship developed between the two and Rudolph often recalled the Mongolian language recordings Lessing made for him when he was recruited by the OSS during the Second World War for a mission to Mongolia which, instead of "Hello," began with "Call off your dogs, I come in peace" (a major motion picture was later made of this mission).  He eventually accepted instead of a position as head of the Chinese section of the U.S. Navy Language School at the University of Colorado, where he worked with Ensho Ashikaga and Y. C. Chu who would later come to UCLA, and where he met Mary Alice Potter, his wife of fifty-nine years.

From 1945 to 1947, he served as Acting Director of and Assistant Keeper of Far Eastern Antiquities at the Royal Ontario Museum of Archaeology (where he was hired by Bishop William White), an experience that instilled in him an interest in ancient books, calligraphy, paintings, and artifacts. Offered his choice in 1947 of either a position at or the opportunity to found a new department of Oriental Languages at UCLA, he chose the latter and remained at UCLA throughout his career.

After coming to UCLA, Rudolph was awarded a Fulbright for research in China.  This was for 1948–1949, the culminating years of the Chinese Revolution.

When he left UCLA, the university library possessed but a single volume in Chinese: a  telephone directory.  By the end of that research year, it had 10,000—some of them rare, many of them important, all of them needed—the core of a functioning research library that is currently among the top ten East Asian libraries in the U.S (today the Richard C. Rudolph East Asian Library).  A true bibliophile, he was never happier than when examining some rare book or manuscript—or a number of works by some famous Chinese calligrapher, separated for centuries and now brought together again by him after years of tireless searching—unless it was when he was showing someone else these latest finds.  He was always as well acquainted with the campus librarians as he was with his fellow scholars.

Rudolph was best known for his work on the famous tomb reliefs of the Western Han (Han Tomb Art of West China).  He also worked on a wide range of interests including the history of Chinese printing (A Chinese Printing Manual), ancient Chinese archaeology, ancient Chinese historiography, literature, bronzes, tomb objects, tomb iconography, the salt industry, botanical works, medicine, riddles and games, the application of carbon dating to ancient Chinese artifacts, Chinese porcelain in Mexico, early (14th century) Italians in China, Manchu studies, Japanese maps, and the work in Japan of the Swedish naturalist Thunberg. One of the few Western scholars at the time who kept systematically abreast of ongoing archaeological efforts in China, he was asked to direct the American Council of Learned Societies' important project “Abstracts of Chinese Archaeology” from 1968 to 1973.

Before his retirement in 1976, he served as departmental chair for sixteen years and sat on many editorial boards.  He was awarded two Guggenheim fellowships (plus one renewal), two Fulbright fellowships (plus one renewal), a Fulbright Distinguished Senior Scholar Award, two American Philosophical Society Grants, a University of California Humanities Institute Award, a Ford Foundation Grant, and an ACLS fellowship.  But the honor that he was most proud of was when, in 1981, the UCLA Oriental Library was renamed the Richard C. Rudolph Oriental Library in acknowledgment of his efforts in building the collection (it was renamed the Richard C. Rudolph East Asian Library in 1990).

With retirement, Rudolph took up the direction of the UC Education Abroad Program and continued his research.  But he became increasingly absorbed with collecting ancient maps, paintings, printing blocks, manuscripts, and rare books—even a little porcelain—focusing especially on Chinese and Japanese printing, medicine, botany, physiology, and the reception of Western science by the East.  Radically failing eyesight became a great frustration to him, as did a seemingly unending succession of life-threatening but largely passing ailments, his phenomenal resistance to which constantly amazed his doctors.

He had three children, Richard C. Rudolph Jr., Conrad Rudolph, and Deborah Rudolph.

References

Bibliography 
 In Memoriam, University of California, Academic Senate: http://senate.universityofcalifornia.edu/inmemoriam/RichardC.Rudolph.htm
 ed. Kenneth D. Klein, Creating an Oriental Languages Department and Library, UCLA Oral History Program (Los Angeles 1985).
 "Book Buying in China 1948-49: An Interview with Richard C. Rudolph," Journal of Asian Culture 6 (1982) 3-18.
 ed. Jun Suzuki and Mihoko Miki, "Richard C. Rudolph East Asian Library and Japanese Rare Books," Catalog of Rare Japanese Materials at the University of California, Los Angeles (Richard C. Rudolph East Asian Library Bibliographic Series no. 4, pp. xxxi-xxxiv.
 "Richard Casper Rudolph," The Journal of Asian Studies 62 (2003) 1031-1033.
 "A List of Publications of Richard C. Rudolph up to 1978," Monumenta Serica: Journal of Oriental Studies 34 (1979-1980) pp. i-v.
 "The Circle Closed: UCLA's Chinese Holdings Are Doubled," UCLA Librarian 18 (February 1965) pp. 31–32.

1909 births
2003 deaths
University of California, Los Angeles faculty
University of Colorado faculty
American sinologists